"Mama ŠČ!" is a song by Croatian shock rock band Let 3, released on 20 January 2023. The song is set to represent Croatia in the Eurovision Song Contest 2023 after winning Dora 2023, Croatia's national selection for that year's Eurovision Song Contest.

Background and composition 
In interviews with Jutarnji list, the band reported that the song title had been inspired by the "first letter of the oldest alphabet in the world", "ŠČ". The song, according to the band, is an anti-war song; in the interview, the band reported that after total Armageddon has been waged on Earth, a rocket would land on Earth, containing the letters "ŠČ". In other interviews, the band has also claimed that "ŠČ" could also mean the sound someone makes when somebody orgasms, a blood type, or a sound someone makes when they are meditating. It is also a reference to the Russian letter Shcha.

In further interviews with the Croatian newsite Pressing, the band claimed that the song was a metaphor for the Russian Federation. The band claims that in the song, they mock dictators for being "childish", with an emphasis on the Russian president Vladimir Putin and his decision to launch the 2022 Russian invasion of Ukraine.

According to Hrvoje Cvijanović, the "tractor", which is mentioned numerous times in the song, is symbolism for the Belarusian president Alexander Lukashenko, who has aided Russia in the invasion, including by gifting a tractor to Putin for his 70th birthday. The song criticizes both leaders, calling them "psychopaths".

Commercial performance 
On the issue of 6 February 2023, "Mama ŠČ!" debuted at number 27 on the Croatian HR Top 40 chart. This marks their first chart entry in less than a year, the last being "Drama", a collaboration with Croatian singer Alka Vuica in early 2022 issued on 21 March. In its second week on the chart, the song fell two spots to number 29. After the performance at Dora 2023, the song rose to a new peak at number four in its third week on the chart. By peaking at number four, "Mama ŠČ" became the band's highest charting song on the HR Top 40 chart to date. A week later, in its fourth week on the chart, the song topped the chart becoming Let 3's first chart topper in Croatia. 

In the week of 25 February 2023, "Mama ŠČ" debuted at number six on Billboard's Croatia Songs chart, becoming the band's first song to do so. It was also Croatia's first Eurovision entry to chart on the Croatia Songs chart. The song stayed on the chart for a total of two weeks.

Eurovision Song Contest

Dora 2023 
Dora 2023 was the twenty-fourth edition of the Croatian national selection Dora which selects Croatia's entry for the Eurovision Song Contest. The competition would consist of eighteen entries competing in one final on 11 February 2023.

The song was considered by Croatian media outlets as a heavy favorite within the public to win Dora 2023. During their live performance, the band were dressed in stereotypical military uniforms, with one member dressing up as Vladimir Lenin holding two rockets. All members had imprints of roses in the band members' buttocks. At the end of the show's voting, it was revealed that "Mama ŠČ!" had won the competition, thus earning the Croatian spot for the Eurovision Song Contest 2023. After winning Dora, Let 3 announced that they might travel to Liverpool on an ecologically acceptable tractor "with steering wheel on the other side" since they were going to the United Kingdom.

At Eurovision 
According to Eurovision rules, all nations with the exceptions of the host country and the "Big Five" (France, Germany, Italy, Spain and the United Kingdom) are required to qualify from one of two semi-finals in order to compete for the final; the top ten countries from each semi-final progress to the final. The European Broadcasting Union (EBU) split up the competing countries into six different pots based on voting patterns from previous contests, with countries with favourable voting histories put into the same pot. On 31 January 2023, an allocation draw was held which placed each country into one of the two semi-finals, as well as which half of the show they would perform in. Croatia has been placed into the first semi-final, to be held on 9 May 2023, and has been scheduled to perform in the first half of the show.

Months before the Eurovision Song Contest 2023, Wiwibloggs, a Eurovision fansite, would run a poll asking readers to vote on their favorite songs on every song that was released for the Eurovision Song Contest 2023 up to 18 February 2023. "Mama ŠČ" would manage to take first in the poll that reported 31,437 votes, with "Mama ŠČ" earning 16,974 of those votes, around 53.99% of the overall vote.

Charts

References 

2023 songs
2023 singles
Eurovision songs of 2023
Eurovision songs of Croatia
Songs about the 2022 Russian invasion of Ukraine